Helgi Valur Daníelsson (born 13 July 1981] is an Icelandic former professional footballer who played as a defensive midfielder. He played professionally in England, Sweden, Germany, Portugal, Iceland, and Denmark during a career that spanned between 1998 and 2021. A full international between 2001 and 2014, he won 33 caps for the Iceland national team.

Club career
In 2006, he left Fylkir who he had joined from Peterborough United for £25,000 in 2003, to go to Sweden to play for Östers IF in Allsvenskan.

On 12 December 2007, Helgi signed a contract with IF Elfsborg. On 22 January 2010, he left Elfsborg and joined Second Bundesliga club Hansa Rostock. After just a few months in the German side, he signed a deal with reigning Swedish champions AIK. On 2 July 2013, it was announced that he would transfer to Primeira Liga side Belenenses after AIK's game vs. Häcken on 22 July.

On 27 August 2014, Helgi terminated his contract with Belenenses for personal reason's. Two days later he signed a 2-year contract for the Danish 1. division side AGF.

International career
A defensive midfielder, Helgi has played for the Iceland national football team at youth and senior level.

Playing style

A predominantly defensive midfielder with excellent ball winning and positioning abilIty. Good in the air and comfortable on the ball.   An eye for goal especially from set pieces.

Career statistics

References

External links

Profile UpThePosh! The Peterborough United Database

1981 births
Living people
People from Uppsala
AIK Fotboll players
Association football midfielders
Helgi Danielsson
Peterborough United F.C. players
Östers IF players
Helgi Danielsson
Helgi Danielsson
Helgi Danielsson
Helgi Danielsson
Helgi Danielsson
IF Elfsborg players
FC Hansa Rostock players
C.F. Os Belenenses players
Aarhus Gymnastikforening players
Helgi Danielsson
English Football League players
Allsvenskan players
Superettan players
2. Bundesliga players
Primeira Liga players
Danish 1st Division players
Expatriate footballers in England
Expatriate footballers in Germany
Expatriate footballers in Sweden
Expatriate footballers in Portugal
Expatriate men's footballers in Denmark
Helgi Danielsson
Helgi Danielsson